The Anti-Communist and Anti-Russian Aggression Song ( or 反共復國歌), also known as Fighting Communism is a Chinese anti-communist and russophobic patriotic song written by Chiang Kai-shek and composed by Xiao Huahua. The song was written in the early 1950s by Chiang to "promote Anti-communism against the Soviet Union", and was mandatory learning in the Taiwanese musical curriculum from 1952 until 1975.

Lyrics

Legacy
The song was uploaded by the hacking group Anonymous to a website belonging to the Polar Research Institute of China in January 2022.

See also
800 Heroes Song
Go and Reclaim the Mainland
Chiang Kai-shek
"Taiwan is Good"
"Chiang Kai-shek Memorial Song"
"Ode to the Republic of China"

References

1950s songs
Anti-communism in China
Anti-Russian sentiment
Chinese patriotic songs